Russell Andrew Mark,  (born 25 February 1964 in Hoppers Crossing, Victoria, Australia) is an Australian Olympic Champion Shooter. He won the Olympic gold medal in double trap at the 1996 Summer Olympics in Atlanta. He also won an Olympic silver medal at the 2000 Summer Olympics in Sydney. He has competed at six Olympic Games: 1988, 1992, 1996, 2000, 2008, 2012. The only Australian Summer Olympian to compete in more Olympiads is Andrew Hoy, who competed in seven.

His win at the Atlanta 1996 Summer Olympics gave him the distinction of being the inaugural shotgun shooter of the sport to win all four of the world major individual titles: World Cup, World Cup Final, World Championship and Olympic Games. Uniquely after the Sydney 2000 Summer Olympics he also has a set of silver medals in all four major titles, an honour he shares with the American clay target shooter Kimberley Rhode.

Mark is also a world-renowned professional clay target shooting coach. In 2022 he controversially agreed on a one year contract to be employed by the Sports Authority of India as the principle trap shooting coach for the Indian Shotgun Team. 

Mark is a dual World Individual Champion (1994, 1997) and dual World Team Champion (1998 and 1999). He won an individual World Cup gold medal in Los Angeles, USA (1991); this was the first-ever World Cup individual gold medal by an Australian in any Shooting discipline. He also won gold medals in Lonato, Italy (1992); Munich, Germany (1994); Lima, Peru (1999); Sydney, Australia (2000); and Perth, Australia (2003). At the 2006 Commonwealth Games in Melbourne, Mark won a gold medal in men's double trap.

In August 2007, in Munich, Germany, the International Shooting Sports Federation inducted him into its Hall of Fame as the greatest double trap shooter of all time. This was an accolade he shared with fellow shotgun shooters Luciano Giovannetti (men's trap, from Italy), Kimberly Rhode (women's double trap and skeet, from USA), and Susan Nattrass (women's trap, from Canada).

In 1997, Mark was honoured with the Order of Australia Medal for services to sport and the Australian Sports Medal in June 2000.

In August 2019, Russell Mark was nominated to the Sport Australia Hall of Fame. He is the second shotgun shooter so honoured. He was preceded by Donald Macintosh who titled at the Paris 1900 Summer Olympics.

Personal life
Mark was educated in Ballarat, Victoria, at the Brown Hill Primary School (1969 – 1974) and Ballarat East High School (1975 – 1981). He completed a Diploma of Business Studies at the Royal Melbourne Institute of Technology (1982 – 1985), and worked in the real estate industry as a real estate valuer from 1985 until 1997.

In 1997, Mark started working for Melbourne radio station 3AW as a sports presenter. In 2002 he commenced a role as a sports commentator on ABC radio where he worked for the next 13 years on the breakfast show with iconic media personality Red Symons. Mark retired from radio work in 2016.

Russell Mark worked for Australian television Network Channel 7 as a commentator at the Rio 2016 and Tokyo 2021 Summer Olympics as well as the 1998 Malaysia and 2018 Gold Coast Commonwealth Games.

Mark owns and is a director of two hotels in his home town of Hoppers Crossing, Victoria and is a director of an entertainment clay target shooting business, Go Shooting Pty Ltd.

Mark was an Athlete's Representative on the Australian Olympic Committee's Athletes Commission from 1997 until 2004. He served as an Executive Board Member on the Victorian Olympic Committee from 2005 until 2012. He was also a board member for Shooting Australia on two occasions from 2007 to 2009 and from 2011 to 2013. He has been an official Ambassador for the Carlton Football Club (Australian Football League) since 1997.

Since 1999 Mark has written a monthly column for the Australian Shooting Magazine the Australian Shooters Journal.

Family
Mark married fellow champion shooter and triple Commonwealth Games gold medallist and dual Olympian Lauryn Mark on 17 March 2004, on a Hamilton Island beach in a surprise wedding ceremony. He has three children, Holly Anne Mark (b.10/09/98), Sierra Evelyn Mark (b.23/06/05) and Indiana Todd Mark (b.29/01/07)

Competition shooting career
Mark's career includes an individual Olympic Gold and silver medal, 2 individual World Championships, 6 World Cup Championships and 2 World Team Championships as well as 39 Australian National Open Championships (current record holder). His first Open Australian Championship came in 1980 as a sixteen-year-old junior competitor in Perth where he also set a new Australian Open Record. He had a run of twenty consecutive years from 1988 to 2007 where he won at least one Australian Title each year.

In September 1992 at a major tournament in Tamworth, NSW, Mark became the first Australian to hit more than one thousand targets in succession. He finished the competition with 1177 hits in a row breaking his own Australian record set in January 1992 in Canberra of 859 consecutive hits.

In 1997, he won the men's double trap World Championship in Peru with a new World Record.

In 2004, Mark served as part of the administrative support team at the Athens 2004 Summer Olympics working for the Australian Olympic Committee as an Athlete's Liaison Officer. Also during 2004 he controversially took the position as the personal coach to the Indian marksman Rajyavardhan Singh Rathore who went on to become India's first ever individual Olympic medalist at the Athens Olympics by winning a silver medal.

In 2006, Mark competed at the Melbourne Commonwealth Games where he won a gold medal. He participated in the Beijing 2008 Summer Olympics where he finished 5th in Olympic men's double trap. In 2010, he declared an intention to make the London 2012 Summer Olympics his sixth appearance. On 7 June 2012, Mark was named in the Olympic team.

He has competed at six Commonwealth Games (1990, 1994, 2002, 2006, 2010, 2014). He competed in the open individual ISSF World Championships on 22 occasions: (1986, 1987, 1989, 1990, 1991, 1993, 1994, 1995, 1997, 1998, 1999, 2001, 2002, 2003, 2005, 2006, 2007, 2009, 2010, 2011, 2013, 2014). This is a record for any Australian shotgun athlete.

Mark retired from international competition after the 2014 ISSF World Championship in Spain.

Marks' home shooting range was the Werribee-Victorian Clay Target Club. He was made a life member of the club in 1996.

In March 2009, Mark was inducted into the Australian Clay Target Association's Hall of Fame as the youngest member.

Mark has been a Global Ambassador for the world's leading firearm manufacturer, Beretta Italy, since 1986.

In 2019, Mark was inducted into the Sport Australia Hall of Fame.

References

External links
Russell Mark's Profile pdf

1964 births
Living people
Australian male sport shooters
Shooters at the 1988 Summer Olympics
Shooters at the 1992 Summer Olympics
Shooters at the 1996 Summer Olympics
Shooters at the 2000 Summer Olympics
Shooters at the 2008 Summer Olympics
Shooters at the 2012 Summer Olympics
Olympic shooters of Australia
Olympic gold medalists for Australia
Olympic silver medalists for Australia
Trap and double trap shooters
Commonwealth Games gold medallists for Australia
Olympic medalists in shooting
Medalists at the 1996 Summer Olympics
Medalists at the 2000 Summer Olympics
Shooters at the 2014 Commonwealth Games
Commonwealth Games bronze medallists for Australia
Commonwealth Games medallists in shooting
Recipients of the Medal of the Order of Australia
Recipients of the Australian Sports Medal
Sport Australia Hall of Fame inductees
RMIT University alumni
Australian sports commentators
Radio personalities from Melbourne
Sportspeople from Melbourne
People from Hoppers Crossing, Victoria
Sportsmen from Victoria (Australia)
Medallists at the 1990 Commonwealth Games
Medallists at the 2002 Commonwealth Games
Medallists at the 2006 Commonwealth Games
Medallists at the 2010 Commonwealth Games